Waverly, known today as Old Waverly, is an unincorporated community in Walker County, Texas.  It is located at the intersection of Texas State Highway 150 and Farm to Market Road 1725.  Its population is 200 as of 2000.

History 
James Winters settled in Waverly in 1835. By 1852, 300 people, including some slaves, were in the area.  The town was incorporated in 1858.  A post office operated there from 1855 to 1872.  Around that same time, Methodist, Presbyterian, and Episcopalian churches were started in the town.  The town diminished around 1870 after Waverly town leaders would not give the railroad the right of way because they feared that the railroad would attract "tramps and ignorants to the town and kill cattle".  In 1896, the population was up to 400, but dwindled to 100 by 1925.  By the 1980s, all that was left of Waverly was a cemetery, a Presbyterian church, and a subdivision.

Education 
Old Waverly is served by the Coldspring-Oakhurst Consolidated Independent School District.

References

Unincorporated communities in Walker County, Texas